Phomopsis azadirachtae is a fungus, a species of the genus Phomopsis.  It has been identified as the fungus responsible for dieback in Azadirachta indica (neem) in India.  The species was first identified and described by Sateesh et al in 1997.

References 

 Vedashree, S., Sateesh M.K., Chowdappa, P. and Nirmal Kumar, B. J. 2015. Species-specific PCR-based assay for identification and detection of Phomopsis (Diaporthe) azadirachtae causing die-back disease in Azadirachta indica. Journal of Phytopathology. DOI: 10.1111/jph.12380

Further reading 
 
 

Fungal tree pathogens and diseases
azadirachtae